William Edward Metzger Jr. (February 9, 1922 – November 9, 1944) was a United States Army Air Forces officer and a recipient of the United States military's highest decoration—the Medal of Honor—for his actions in World War II.

Metzger joined the Army from his birthplace of Lima, Ohio in October 1942, and by November 9, 1944, was a second lieutenant serving as  the co-pilot of a B-17 Flying Fortress in the 729th Bomb Squadron, 452nd Bombardment Group. On that day, during a bombing mission over Saarbrücken, Germany, his plane was severely damaged and several of the crew were wounded by enemy fire. Knowing that the most seriously injured crewman needed immediate medical aid, and fearing that he would not receive such aid if he was dropped by parachute into enemy territory, Metzger and the pilot, Donald J. Gott, decided to try to fly the crippled aircraft back into Allied territory. Once reaching friendly airspace, Metzger chose to stay behind with the pilot and seriously injured man while the other crewmen parachuted to safety. He and the pilot attempted a crash landing, but the aircraft exploded before touching down, killing all three on board. For their actions, both Metzger and Gott were posthumously awarded the Medal of Honor six months later, on May 16, 1945.

Metzger, aged 22 at his death, was buried at Woodlawn Cemetery in his hometown of Lima, Ohio.

Medal of Honor citation
Second Lieutenant Metzger's official Medal of Honor citation reads:
On a bombing run upon the marshaling yards at Saarbrücken, Germany, on 9 November 1944, a B17 aircraft on which 2d Lt. Metzger was serving as copilot was seriously damaged by antiaircraft fire. Three of the aircraft's engines were damaged beyond control and on fire; dangerous flames from the No. 4 engine were leaping back as far as the tail assembly. Flares in the cockpit were ignited and a fire roared therein which was further increased by free-flowing fluid from damaged hydraulic lines. The interphone system was rendered useless. In addition to these serious mechanical difficulties the engineer was wounded in the leg and the radio operator's arm was severed below the elbow. Suffering from intense pain, despite the application of a tourniquet, the radio operator fell unconscious. Faced with the imminent explosion of his aircraft and death to his entire crew, mere seconds before bombs away on the target, 2d Lt. Metzger and his pilot conferred. Something had to be done immediately to save the life of the wounded radio operator. The lack of a static line and the thought that his unconscious body striking the ground in unknown territory would not bring immediate medical attention forced a quick decision. 2d Lt. Metzger and his pilot decided to fly the flaming aircraft to friendly territory and then attempt to crash land. Bombs were released on the target and the crippled aircraft proceeded along to Allied-controlled territory. When that had been reached 2d Lt. Metzger personally informed all crewmembers to bail out upon the suggestion of the pilot. 2d Lt. Metzger chose to remain with the pilot for the crash landing in order to assist him in this emergency. With only 1 normally functioning engine and with the danger of explosion much greater, the aircraft banked into an open field, and when it was at an altitude of 100 feet it exploded, crashed, exploded again, and then disintegrated. All 3 crewmembers were instantly killed. 2d Lt. Metzger's loyalty to his crew, his determination to accomplish the task set forth to him, and his deed of knowingly performing what may have been his last service to his country was an example of valor at its highest.

See also

List of Medal of Honor recipients

References

External links

1922 births
1944 deaths
United States Army Air Forces personnel killed in World War II
United States Army Air Forces Medal of Honor recipients
People from Lima, Ohio
United States Army Air Forces officers
United States Army Air Forces pilots of World War II
World War II recipients of the Medal of Honor
Aviators killed by being shot down
Aviators killed in aviation accidents or incidents